The American Latino Media Arts Award or ALMA Award, formerly known as Latin Oscars Award, is an award highlighting the best American Latino contributions to music, television, and film. The awards promote fair and accurate portrayals of Latinos. In Spanish and Portuguese the word alma means "soul."

History

The awards were created by UnidosUS (formerly the National Council of La Raza). The first ceremonies were held in 1987 under the name "BRAVO Awards" and broadcast on Univision. In 1995, they were televised on Fox. The name was changed to the "American Latino Media Arts Awards" in 1997 and ABC became the network venue. However, ABC faced a boycott which forced the award ceremonies to be postponed until 1998.

From the years 2003 to 2005, the ceremonies were not held for undisclosed reasons. In 2008 the NCLR and New York firm Society Awards redesigned the trophy statuette. ABC stopped airing the ceremonies in 2009.

The ceremonies were cancelled in 2010, to "focus on a bigger and better show in 2011."

The awards started up again in 2011, on a new network, NBC.

They were cancelled for 2015.

In 2018, Fuse announced that it had acquired the rights to the award show in partnership with UnidosUS.

Award ceremonies

References

External links

 Official website
 

 
American film awards
Awards established in 1987
Awards honoring Hispanic and Latino Americans
Latin American film awards
1987 establishments in the United States